"Bonamana" (Korean title: 미인아 Miina; literal meaning Beauty) is a song performed by South Korean boy band Super Junior. It is the lead single from the group's fourth studio album, Bonamana. The song was released as a digital single on May 10, 2010, three days before the South Korean release of Bonamana. The song was composed and arranged by Yoo Young-jin, who also penned the lyrics.

Background
Made in the style "SJ Funky", which Super Junior had been exploring since the release of their third studio album, Sorry, Sorry, "Bonamana" draws influences from American electronica, funk and hip hop, incorporating African rhythms and club house beats into the melody, similar to the song's writer Yoo Young-jin, who later displayed the same style in Super Junior-M's "Super Girl" and Shinee's "Ring Ding Dong". The song incorporates the Afro tom, an African percussive instrument, and the riff of a Jupiter synth, a sound synthesizer. Vocals are also autotuned. The song is about the sincerity of a man who is trying to win a girl's love, with the lyrics having been described as witty and humorous.

Promotion and reception
On May 6, 2010, "Bonamana" was announced to be the lead single from the group's fourth album. The full single was released via digital download on South Korean MP3 download sites on May 10. The song was first performed on KBS2TV's music show Music Bank on May 14, and their performance peaked at number 3 on Nate's top trending search. The group performed "Bonamana" on MBC's Show! Music Core on May 15 and on SBS's The Music Trend on May 16.

After only one week in the charts, "Bonamana" surged to number 1 on Music Bank'''s K-Chart, making it Super Junior's fastest rise to the top of the chart for a lead single.

Music video

Directed by Jang Jae-hyuk, the music video was filmed in a filming set in Namyangju, Gyeonggi in late April 2010. The video is fairly low budget and was entirely shot in a disoriented sepia color, with shadows and alternating brighter lights shining on the members, consistently changing the lighting of the video. The video first begins with different angle shots of each member standing and slowly spinning around in a dark background with alternating backlighting, and then proceeds to a lighter tone when the song begins. A majority of the music video focuses on showing the group's various hip-hop dance formations and techniques. The choreography of the dance is inspired by speed skating, and the dance steps during the first hook of the song is inspired by Kim Yuna's "Danse Macabre" performance. Also, in the music video, there is a dance break performed by all members.

A minute-long teaser of the music video was revealed on May 7 through YouTube, and the full music video premiered on May 12 on Korea's GOMTV video site and through SM Entertainment's official YouTube account, attracting over 600,000 views on the first day of release. It currently has over 102 million views.

 Accolades 

Japanese release
On April 25, 2011, it was announced that the single would be re-released in a Japanese version through the Japanese convenience store chain Circle K Sunkus. The song was released as a digital download on May 18, 2011, followed by a physical release on June 8, 2011, making it their first official Japanese single. An upcoming CM (commercial movie) for the tie-up was filmed in February 2011, with the Japanese lyrics recorded a month after, in March 2011. The single debuted at number two on the Oricon chart on its day of release. According to the Oricon Chart, Bonamana (美人)'' sold 27,168 units on its release day. In addition, the music video, which consists of videos from the Super Junior 3rd Asia Tour Super Show 3 in Japan held at Yokohama Arena in February, received over 300,000 views on the Japanese UCC website Nikoniko in a day.

Personnel
Credits adapted from album's liner notes.

Studio 
 SM Booming System – recording, mixing, digital editing
 Sonic Korea – mastering

Personnel 
 SM Entertainment – executive producer
 Lee Soo-man – producer
 Super Junior – vocals, background vocals 
 Yoo Young-jin – producer, Korean lyrics, composition, arrangement, vocal directing, background vocals, recording, mixing, digital editing, music and sound supervisor
 Goro Matsui – Japanese lyrics
 Jeon Hoon – mastering

Charts

Korean version

Japanese version

References

External links 
 SM Entertainment's Official Site
 Super Junior's Official Site 

Super Junior songs
Korean-language songs
2010 singles
SM Entertainment singles
Songs written by Yoo Young-jin
Songs with lyrics by Gorō Matsui
Avex Trax singles
2010 songs